Shaikh Rohale Asghar (born 24 October 1952) is a Pakistani politician  who has been a member of the National Assembly of Pakistan, since August 2018. Previously, he was a member of the National Assembly from 1985 to 1988 and again from 2008 to May 2020. He was a member of the Provincial Assembly of the Punjab from 1990 to 1993.

Early life
He was born on 24 October 1952.

Political career

He was elected to the National Assembly of Pakistan from Constituency NA-83 (Lahore-III) in 1985 Pakistani general election.

He ran for the seat of the National Assembly as a candidate of Islami Jamhoori Ittehad (IJI) from Constituency NA-93 (Lahore-II) in 1988 Pakistani general election but was unsuccessful. He received 41,181 votes and lost the seat to Aitzaz Ahsan.

He was elected to the Provincial Assembly of the Punjab as a candidate of IJI from Constituency PP-118 (Lahore-III) in 1990 Pakistani general election. He received 42,058 votes and defeated Mian Aziz-ur-Rehman Chan, a candidate of Pakistan Democratic Alliance (PDA).

He ran for the seat of the Provincial Assembly of the Punjab as an independent candidate from Constituency PP-118 (Lahore-III) in 1993 Pakistani general election but was unsuccessful. He received 9,432 votes and lost the seat to Muhammad Hanif Ramay, a candidate of Pakistan Peoples Party (PPP).

He ran for the seat of the Provincial Assembly of the Punjab as a candidate of PPP from Constituency PP-118 (Lahore-III) in 1997 Pakistani general election but was unsuccessful. He received 17,419 votes and lost the seat to Haji Imdad Hussain, a candidate of Pakistan Muslim League (N) (PML-N).

He was re-elected to the National Assembly as a candidate of PML-N from Constituency NA-124 (Lahore-VII) in 2008 Pakistani general election. He received 71,342 votes and defeated Ayaz Imran, a candidate of PPP.

He was re-elected to the National Assembly as a candidate of PML-N from Constituency NA-124 (Lahore-VII) in 2013 Pakistani general election. He received 119,312 votes and defeated Walid Iqbal, a candidate of Pakistan Tehreek-e-Insaf (PTI).

He was re-elected to the National Assembly as a candidate of PML-N from Constituency NA-128 (Lahore-VI) in 2018 Pakistani general election. He received 98,199 votes and defeated Aijaz Ahmed, a candidate of PTI.

References

Living people
Pakistan Muslim League (N) politicians
Punjabi people
1952 births
Pakistani MNAs 2008–2013
Pakistani MNAs 2013–2018
Punjab MPAs 1990–1993
Pakistani MNAs 1985–1988
Pakistani MNAs 2018–2023